Namoi, an electoral district of the Legislative Assembly in the Australian state of New South Wales had two incarnations, from 1880 to 1894 and from 1904 to 1950.


Election results

Elections in the 1940s

1947

1944

1941

Elections in the 1930s

1938

1935

1932

1930

Elections in the 1920s

1927

1925

1923 appointment
Patrick Scully resigned on 20 September 1923. Between 1920 and 1927 the Legislative Assembly was elected using a form of proportional representation with multi-member seats and a single transferable vote (modified Hare-Clark). The Parliamentary Elections (Casual Vacancies) Act, provided that casual vacancies were filled by the next unsuccessful candidate "who represents the same party interest as the late member".
William Scully had the highest number of votes of the unsuccessful Labor candidates at the 1922 election and took his seat on 20 September 1923.

1922

1920

Elections in the 1910s

1917

1913

1910

Elections in the 1900s

1907

1904

1894 - 1904

Elections in the 1890s

1891
This section is an excerpt from 1891 New South Wales colonial election § The Namoi

1890 by-election

Elections in the 1880s

1889
This section is an excerpt from 1889 New South Wales colonial election § The Namoi

1887
This section is an excerpt from 1887 New South Wales colonial election § The Namoi

1885
This section is an excerpt from 1885 New South Wales colonial election § The Namoi

1882
This section is an excerpt from 1882 New South Wales colonial election § The Namoi

1880
This section is an excerpt from 1880 New South Wales colonial election § The Namoi

Notes

References

New South Wales state electoral results by district